was a Rear Admiral in the Imperial Japanese Navy. He was the commander of the Japanese garrison on the island of Betio of the Tarawa atoll during World War II.

Biography
Shibazaki was born in Kasai, Hyogo prefecture. He was a graduate of the 43rd class of the Imperial Japanese Naval Academy in 1915, ranking 26th out of 95 cadets. He served as midshipman on the cruiser Azuma and battleship Settsu. As a Kaigun Shōi (Ensign), he was assigned to Satsuma and cruiser Yakumo. As a Kaigun Chūi (Lieutenant junior grade), he served on the cruiser Chikuma, destroyer Kaba and battleship Yamashiro.

Shibazaki was promoted to Kaigun Taii (lieutenant) in 1921, and after taking courses in navigation, was assigned as chief navigator to Tachikaze, oiler Kamoi and survey ship Musashi. After his promotion to Kaigun Shōsa (lieutenant-commander) in 1927, he was appointed aide-de-camp to Prince Kuni Asaakira from 1932-1933. In 1936, he received his first command, the gunboat Ataka. Promoted to Kaigun Taisa (captain) in 1937, he served in various staff positions, primarily in Kure and in Shanghai.

Shibazaki was promoted to Kaigun Shōshō (rear admiral) on 1 May 1943. He arrived on Betio in Tarawa in September 1943 to take command of the Japanese garrison, including 1,122 Imperial Marines forming the 3rd Special Base Force (formerly the 6th Yokosuka SNLF), 1,497 sailors forming the 7th Sasebo Special Naval Landing Force, and 1,427 (mostly Korean and Chinese) laborers forming the 111th Pioneers construction unit, and a detachment of 970 laborers from the 4th Fleet Construction Unit.

Shibazaki was a veteran of amphibious landings in China during the late 1930s and was aware of the difficulties facing an amphibious landing force. He built extensive defenses on Betio to defend its strategically important airfield, and famously boasted to his troops that "it would take one million men one hundred years" to conquer the island.

Shibazaki was killed in action on the first day of the Battle of Tarawa, sometime during the mid-afternoon of 20 November 1943. Reportedly, he and all his senior officers were killed by 5" naval gunfire (airbursts) from a United States Navy destroyer, either USS Dashiell or USS Ringgold, after the men were spotted walking to a secondary command post away from the front lines on the beaches.  Shibazaki was posthumously promoted to vice-admiral.

References

Notes

Books

External links

1894 births
1943 deaths
Battle of Tarawa
Military personnel from Hyōgo Prefecture
Imperial Japanese Navy admirals
Japanese admirals of World War II
Japanese military personnel killed in World War II